The 2017–18 season was the club's 5th season in the Scottish Premiership and their sixth consecutive appearance in the top flight of Scottish football. Ross County also competed in the League Cup and the Scottish Cup. 

On 25 September, manager Jim McIntyre was sacked by the club. On 28 September, Owen Coyle took over as manager. He resigned on 1 March with Steven Ferguson and Stuart Kettlewell taking over as co-managers but they could not keep County in the Premiership and on 12 May after 6 years they were relegated back to the Championship.

Results & fixtures

Pre-season

Scottish Premiership

Scottish League Cup

Matches

League Cup Group D Table

Knockout stage

Scottish Cup

Squad statistics

Appearances
As of 12 May 2018

|-
|colspan="10"|Players who left the club during the 2017–18 season
|-

|-
|}

Team statistics

League table

Transfers

In

Out

See also
 List of Ross County F.C. seasons

Notes and references

2017–18
Ross County